Long Thanh International Airport is an international airport currently under construction in Long Thanh, Dong Nai, Vietnam, approximately  east of Ho Chi Minh City. The Vietnamese government approved its construction on January 4, 2021.  Construction began the next day on January 5, 2021, and its first phase is scheduled to be finished by 2025. The airport will serve over 100 million passengers annually when built to the maximum designed capacity. The project is the most expensive infrastructure project in Vietnam's history.  It will replace the existing Tan Son Nhat International Airport as the city's main airport.

Vietnam Airlines is suggested by the project consultants as the only Vietnamese carrier to operate domestic flights from Long Thanh; other airlines will operate international flights only from this new airport.

The first phase of the project (with a capacity of 25 million passengers per year, one terminal, one 4000 m x 60 m runway) was officially approved by the Prime Minister of Vietnam on November 11, 2020, with completion planned in 2025.

History

Background
Tan Son Nhat International Airport is the only international airport in the planned Ho Chi Minh City Metropolitan Area (covering , with an estimated population of 20-22 million inhabitants by 2020, of which there will be 16 - 17 million urban inhabitants, accounting for 77 - 80% of total population). Tan Son Nhat airport was built during the Vietnam War to support war transportation, hence its location inside the crowded Ho Chi Minh City where growth is limited. Due to location and safety issues, it is difficult to expand to meet the increasing annual growth of passengers. The maximum design capacity of Tan Son Nhat is 25 million passengers per annum but in 2016 it handled 32.5 million.

The flow of international tourists to the South of Vietnam is increasing dramatically, by 15 to 20 percent annually. Promoting the domestic market (current population of 87 million, forecast of 100 million by 2020) by building a new airport that can adapt to future needs is necessary. Tan Son Nhat airport will serve the international and domestic flights until the completion of the new Long Thanh International Airport. The airport will be able to handle the world's biggest commercial aircraft.

Under current plans by the Vietnamese government, the Airports Corporation of Vietnam will be the main investor and operator of the airport.

Construction 
Construction of the 28,500 resident Loc An - Binh Son resettlement area began in April 2020, and by December 2020, mine clearance of the airport site started. As of January 2021, soldiers have found several unexploded mortar shells at the site. On March 30, 2022, construction of the terminal building started.

Master Plan
The Master Plan for Long Thanh International Airport was approved by the Prime Minister Phan Văn Khải in 2006 and several adjustments have been made through time. The project faced mixed public reaction for its expensive cost and far distance from the center of Ho Chi Minh City.

Based on the demand of transportation, the investment will be divided in phases. The Southern Airports Corporation (a company under the Ministry of Transport (Vietnam)) is in charge of development of this project.

Phase 1 (2021 – 2025)
The first phase is estimated to cost US$7.8billion and will be divided into 3 sub-phases.

Phase 1A (2021 – 2023)
According to the original plan, the airport would handle 25 million passengers per year after this phase is completed; however, the proposed capacity was later lowered to 17 million passengers per year to reduce construction cost. US$5.6billion will be allocated to this phase. One terminal will be built along with a single runway.

Phase 1B (2023 – 2025)
Another runway will be built and increase the total capacity to 25 million passengers per annum.

Phase 1C (2025)
The rest of necessary facilities will be built and land-clearance for future phases will be made. The airport will begin operating in 2025.

Phase 2 (2025 – 2035)
The capacity will be doubled to 50 million passengers per annum and the third runway will be added when the phase is finished, which is scheduled to be in 2035.

Phase 3 (After 2035)
The airport will reach its maximum designed capacity at 80-100 million passengers and 5 million tonnes of cargo per year. Four runways will be operational after the third phase.

Terminal 
Terminal 1 was designed by Korea-based Heerim Architects, and is said to be shaped like a lotus flower, the national flower of Vietnam. The design was based on feedback from the Vietnamese public and experts. The building will have a floor area of  divided over four floors.

Ground transportation

Road
The airport will be accessible via the National Highway 51 and Ho Chi Minh City–Long Thanh–Dau Giay Expressway, construction is expected be completed before the airport opens in 2025. A third road is planned east of the airport and will connect with the Dau Giay–Phan Thiet Expressway as part of the second phase of the airport plan from 2025. The airport will also be accessible via the future Bien Hoa-Vung Tau Expressway.

Rail
Light rail

A light rail line connecting the airport to Thu Thiem, just east of HCMC, is planned. This line would be 38 km long.

High-speed rail

A new high-speed railway service is proposed to be connected to the new airport as part of the Ho Chi Minh City–Nha Trang section of the North-South high-speed railway line. Airport planners propose a high-speed railway line be built to the airport as it will give passengers a more direct and efficient transit option to Ho Chi Minh City than by road which is already congested closer to the city centre.

See also

 Transport in Vietnam
 List of airports in Vietnam

References

External links
The Long Thanh International Airport project approved dongnai.gov.vn, (August 8, 2006)
Southern province to see new airport Viet Nam News, (June 26, 2004)
Airport & Ground Support Equipment (AGSE) in Vietnam by Le Son (11/25/2005)
Vietnam: Opportunity for Bidding for Masterplan of USD $8-Billion Long Thanh International Airport by Le Son (February 15, 2007)
Long Thanh International Airport A comprehensive guide to the future new airport of Ho Chi Minh City.

Airports in Vietnam
Transport in Ho Chi Minh City
Proposed airports in Vietnam
Buildings and structures in Đồng Nai province